Macrocera formosa is a species of predatory fungus gnats, insects in the family Keroplatidae.

References

Keroplatidae
Articles created by Qbugbot
Insects described in 1866